The 1929 FA Cup final was an association football match between Bolton Wanderers and Portsmouth on 27 April 1929 at Wembley Stadium. Bolton won 2–0, with goals by Billy Butler and Harold Blackmore. It marked the 54th final of the Football Association Challenge Cup (FA Cup), the world's oldest football cup competition. It was Portsmouth's first FA Cup final and Bolton's fifth. En route to the final, Bolton defeated Oldham Athletic, Liverpool (after a replay), Leicester City, Blackburn Rovers (after a replay) and Huddersfield Town; Portsmouth beat Charlton Athletic, Bradford City, Chelsea (after a replay), West Ham United and Aston Villa.

The match was played in a front of 92,576 spectators and was refereed by Arnold Josephs. After a goalless first half, two late goals in the second half from Billy Butler and Harold Blackmore secured Bolton the FA Cup. For Bolton this meant that they had won their third FA Cup title.

Road to the Final

Bolton Wanderers

Portsmouth

Match details

References

External links

FA Cup Final lineups
FA Cup Final kits
F.A. Cup Final Match Cards

FA Cup Finals
FA Cup Final 1929
FA Cup Final 1929
FA Cup
FA Cup Final
FA Cup Final